Following is a list of all Article III United States federal judges appointed by President Gerald Ford during his presidency. In total Ford appointed 65 Article III federal judges, including 1 Justice to the Supreme Court of the United States, 12 judges to the United States Courts of Appeals, and 52 judges to the United States district courts.

None of Ford's appointees remain in active service, however 2 appellate judges and 4 district judges remain on senior status. Five additional judges appointed by Ford to district courts remain on senior status as appellate judges by appointment of later presidents, as is one appellate judge appointed to the Supreme Court.

United States Supreme Court justices

Courts of appeals

District courts

References
Notes

General

 

Specific

Renominations

Sources
 Federal Judicial Center

Ford

Gerald Ford-related lists